Carla Bruni-Sarkozy (born Carla Gilberta Bruni Tedeschi; ; 23 December 1967) is an Italian-born French naturalized singer and fashion model. In 2008, she married Nicolas Sarkozy, then president of France.

Bruni was born in Italy and moved to France at the age of seven. She was a model from 1987 to 1997 before taking up a career in music. She wrote several songs for Julien Clerc that were featured on his 2000 album, Si j'étais elle. Bruni released her first album, Quelqu'un m'a dit, in 2003, which eventually spent 34 weeks in the top 10 of the French Albums Chart. Bruni won the Victoire Award for Female Artist of the Year at the 2004 Victoires de la Musique. The same year, Bruni released her second album, No Promises, then the following year, she released her third album, Comme si de rien n'était. In 2013, Bruni released her fourth album, Little French Songs. In 2017, Bruni released her fifth album, French Touch. She has sold 5 million albums during her career.

In 2009, she created the Carla Bruni-Sarkozy Foundation for philanthropic efforts.

Early life and family
Bruni was born in Turin, Italy. She is legally the daughter of Italian concert pianist Marisa Borini and industrialist and classical composer Alberto Bruni Tedeschi. In 2008, however, Bruni told Vanity Fair that her biological father is Maurizio Remmert, a classical guitarist who comes from a wealthy family. When Remmert met Marisa Borini at a concert in Turin, he was a 19-year-old classical guitarist, and their affair lasted six years. Her sister is actress and movie director Valeria Bruni Tedeschi. She had a brother, Virginio Bruni Tedeschi (1959 – 4 July 2006), who died from complications of HIV/AIDS. Her (legal) paternal grandparents and her maternal grandfather were Italian, while the last quarter of her ancestry is French. She is second cousin of Alessandra Martines.

Bruni is heiress to the fortune created by the Italian tire manufacturing company CEAT, founded in the 1920s by her legal grandfather, Virginio Bruni Tedeschi. The company was sold in the 1970s to Pirelli (the brand continues in its former subsidiary in India, founded in 1958). The family moved to France in 1975, purportedly to escape the threat of kidnapping by the Red Brigades, a Communist terrorist group active in Italy in the 1970s and 1980s. Bruni grew up in France from the age of seven, and attended the boarding school Château Mont-Choisi in Lausanne, Switzerland. She went to Paris to study art and architecture, but left school at 19 to become a model. By her biological father, Bruni has a half-sister, Consuelo Remmert.

Career

1987–1996: Early career and modeling

Bruni signed with City Models in 1987, aged 19. Paul Marciano, president and creative director of Guess? Inc., came across her picture among composite cards of aspiring models, and chose her to model with Estelle Lefébure in campaigns for Guess? jeans. Bruni subsequently worked for designers and fashion houses such as Christian Dior, Givenchy, Paco Rabanne, Sonia Rykiel, Christian Lacroix, Karl Lagerfeld, John Galliano, Yves Saint-Laurent, Shiatzy Chen, Chanel, and Versace. By the 1990s, Bruni was among the 20 highest-paid fashion models, earning US$7.5 million in her peak year. While modeling, Bruni dated Eric Clapton, then Mick Jagger. On 11 April 2008, a 1993 nude photograph of Bruni taken during her modelling career sold at auction for US$91,000 (€65,093) – more than 60 times the expected price. She was a modeling subject of a 1999 trompe-l'œil wool-knit dress body painting by Joanne Gair that is included in Gair's second book, Body Painting: Masterpieces by Joanne Gair.

1997–2005: Music career and debut album

In 1997, Bruni quit the world of fashion to devote herself to music. She sent her lyrics to Julien Clerc in 1999, based on which he composed six tracks on his 2000 album Si j'étais elle.

In 2003, her debut album Quelqu'un m'a dit, produced by Louis Bertignac and released in Europe, was a surprise hit, selling 2 million copies. Three songs from the album appear in Hans Canosa's 2005 American film Conversations with Other Women, the song Le Plus Beau du quartier was used in H&M's Christmas 2006 commercial, and the title track was featured in the 2003 movie Le Divorce and in the 2009 movie (500) Days of Summer. In January 2010, her song "L'amoureuse" was featured in an episode of NBC's Chuck, "Chuck vs. First Class".

In 2004, Carla Bruni won an EBBA Award. Every year the European Border Breakers Awards (EBBA) recognize the success of 10 emerging artists or groups who reached audiences outside their own countries with their first internationally released album.

In 2005, she wrote the lyrics for 10 out of 12 songs for Louis Bertignac's new album Longtemps, and performed two duets with him on the album, Les Frôleuses and Sans toi. In 2006, Bruni recorded "Those Little Things", an English-language translation of the Serge Gainsbourg song "Ces petits riens" for the tribute album Monsieur Gainsbourg Revisited. She took part in the opening ceremony of the 2006 Winter Olympics in a parade paying tribute to the Italian flag.

2006–2008: No Promises and Comme si de rien n'était
Her second album, No Promises containing poems by William Butler Yeats, Emily Dickinson, W. H. Auden, Dorothy Parker, Walter de la Mare, and Christina Rossetti, set to music, was released in January 2007.

She continued recording after her marriage. She released her third album Comme si de rien n'était on 11 July 2008. The songs are self-penned except for one rendition of "You Belong to Me" and another song featuring Michel Houellebecq's poem La Possibilité d'une île set to music. Royalties from the album will be donated to unidentified charitable and humanitarian causes.

2009–present: Little French Songs and other projects
Bruni sang for Nelson Mandela's 91st birthday on 18 July 2009 at Radio City Music Hall in New York City.

In September 2009, she recorded a duet with Harry Connick, Jr. for the French edition of his album Your Songs. They sang The Beatles' song "And I Love Her". The album was released in France on 26 October 2009.

Following months of speculation, in a television interview broadcast on 23 November 2009, Bruni revealed that she had accepted a role in a forthcoming Woody Allen film. She admitted her reasoning for embarking on the Paris production;  "I'm not an actress at all. Perhaps I'll be completely hopeless, but I can't miss an opportunity like this one. When I'm a grandmother I'd like to be able to say I made a film with Woody Allen." The film, Midnight in Paris, was released in 2011; Bruni appeared as a guide at the Musée Rodin, who discusses sculptor Auguste Rodin with the leading characters.

In January 2010, she was named in Tatler's top-10 best-dressed list.

In September 2010, she contributed a cover of David Bowie's "Absolute Beginners" for the War Child charity record We Were So Turned On: A Tribute to David Bowie (Manimal Vinyl). They also released the track as a split 7-inch vinyl split with UK legends, Duran Duran.

Italian singer/songwriter Simone Cristicchi's entry in the 2010 San Remo Italian Song Festival was the song "Meno Male", with the chorus lyrics of "Meno male che c'è Carla Bruni" ("Thank goodness for Carla Bruni"). The song appears to mock Bruni and her husband, but Cristicchi stated in an interview for Italian television weekly TV Sorrisi e Canzoni "I use sarcasm to explain our Italian way of always wanting to follow any type of gossip without being interested in real problems." Bruni was to be a guest singer at the 2010 San Remo festival, but withdrew from participating.

In April 2013, Bruni's fourth album Little French Songs was released.

In September 2017, Bruni, along with models Claudia Schiffer, Naomi Campbell, Helena Christensen, and Cindy Crawford, closed the Versace spring/summer 2018 fashion show, which was an homage to the late Gianni Versace.

Bruni presented two three-part music series on BBC Radio 2: Postcards from Paris in 2014  and C'est La Vie in 2018.

Bruni is considered a fashion industry "legend", according to models.com.

Political activities
Following Bruni's marriage to President Nicholas Sarkozy on 2 February 2008, she moved into the Élysée Palace for the remainder of Sarkozy's five-year term. Bruni was given an office on the east wing of the palace, which was known as "Madame's wing" and was assigned a private secretary.

Although constitutionally, Bruni had no official role within government, she assisted her husband with a number of official obligations. She also accompanied Sarkozy on state visits, most notably, to the United Kingdom, where her presence led to the visit being widely publicized. Bruni also accompanied Sarkozy on a state visit to meet the Dalai Lama in August 2008.

In 2008, Bruni caused controversy when she spoke against the extradition of Marina Petrella, an Italian far-left terrorist. Petrella had murdered a police commissioner and assisted in the kidnapping of Italian politician, Aldo Moro. Petrella had been living in France since 1993 and had not been extradited due to the Mitterrand doctrine. Sarkozy eventually chose not to extradite Petrella.

Bruni has represented The Global Fund to Fight AIDS, Tuberculosis and Malaria numerous times as an ambassador and has visited Burkina Faso and Benin while representing the organisation.

In 2010, Forbes magazine ranked Bruni as the 35th-most powerful woman in the world.

Personal life

Political views 

Bruni's political views have been inconsistent over the years, though she has defined herself as a left-winger. She has defended Nicolas Sarkozy and the Union for a Popular Movement numerous times since becoming the First Lady of France and leaving the office.

During the 2007 French presidential election, Bruni stated that she would have voted for Ségolène Royal, who was running against her future husband, Nicolas Sarkozy. Bruni said her lack of French citizenship disallowed her from voting, but she would have voted left wing due to it being family tradition. In an October 2011 interview with the British newspaper The Sunday Herald, Bruni said, "My family have always voted to the left. It's tradition. I'll never vote right wing."

In an interview with Le Point, Bruni said, when asked about her political leanings, "I am left wing, but I'm not against my husband or his party. I am not an activist." In a May 2011 interview with Le Parisien, Bruni said she no longer felt left-wing and identified as an ultra-Sarkozyist.

In a 2012 Vogue magazine interview, Bruni stated, "My generation doesn't need feminism ... I'm not at all an active feminist. On the contrary, I'm bourgeois." On 16 November 2020, she told BBC Radio Five Live: "Of course I'm a feminist, like every woman is" and "My husband is very much a feminist man." She also said that she was "not at all a political person."

In 2012, she stated that she supports same-sex marriage and same-sex adoption.

Relationship with the Enthovens
In 2001, Bruni had her first child, son Aurélien, with philosophy professor Raphaël Enthoven. Bruni has been described as having been the mistress of Enthoven's father, journalist Jean-Paul Enthoven, when she began her relationship with the younger Enthoven, who was at the time married to novelist Justine Lévy; Bruni claims that she only went out with Jean-Paul Enthoven a few times and was never his lover, and that Raphaël Enthoven was already divorcing his wife when she encountered him months after last seeing Jean-Paul. 

The song "Raphaël" from Bruni's album Quelqu'un m'a dit is about her relationship with Raphaël Enthoven, and Justine Lévy's 2004 book Rien de Grave (published in English in 2005 as Nothing Serious) is about the end of her marriage; a character named "Paula" represents Bruni. Bruni told Vanity Fair that Raphaël Enthoven ended their relationship in May 2007 because he felt they had become "like friends", and that they remained on good terms.

Marriage to Nicolas Sarkozy 

Bruni met the recently divorced French president Nicolas Sarkozy in November 2007, at a dinner party. After a brief romance, they married on 2 February 2008 at the Élysée Palace in Paris. The marriage is Bruni's first and Sarkozy's third.  Bruni obtained French nationality not long afterwards. She has since made contradictory statements as to whether she still holds Italian citizenship, as well. On the 28 April 2014 episode of the Ellen DeGeneres Show, she confirmed that she still holds Italian citizenship. Besides her native Italian, Bruni can speak fluent English and French.

Following her marriage to Sarkozy, in February 2008, Bruni continued accompanying him on state visits, including to the United Kingdom in March 2008, which created a sensation in the international press and for the public in both Britain and France. As First Lady, she had an office and staff at her disposal in the East wing of the Élysée Palace.

Controversy arose on the eve of the state visit to the UK, with the publication by Christie's auction house of a nude photograph of Bruni taken during her career as a model. The photograph sold for $91,000. Also, great interest began in Bruni's wardrobe, which was Christian Dior, seen as a diplomatic choice, since Dior is a French design house, but the wardrobe was designed by John Galliano, a British designer working for Dior. Another controversy was the use of a popular photo of the French President and Bruni in the print advertising of Ryanair. The couple was awarded damages by a French court, which they donated to Les Restos du Cœur, an organisation that provides meals to the homeless.

In December 2008, Bruni sued the makers of a bag featuring a nude shot taken during her youth. Clothes designer Pardon produced 10,000 of the shopping bags emblazoned with the nude photo taken in 1993, showing Bruni staring at the camera with her crossed hands covering her crotch.

In late August 2010, Iran's state-run daily paper Kayhan called Bruni a 'prostitute' after she had condemned the stoning sentence against Sakineh Mohammadi Ashtiani for adultery in an open letter, along with several French celebrities, including actress Isabelle Adjani. The paper later also called for Bruni to be put to death for supporting Sakineh Ashtiani, and for what the paper described as Bruni's moral corruption and having had extramarital affairs herself. Though Kayhan is a state-sponsored paper that, along with other state-run Iranian media, continued its tirade against Bruni, Iranian officials tried to distance themselves from that violent stance and openly condemned it, while a spokesman for the French Foreign Ministry criticized the comments as being 'unacceptable'. Then-President of Iran Mahmoud Ahmadinejad also condemned the remark made by the paper.

On 19 October 2011, Bruni gave birth to a daughter, Giulia, in the Clinique de la Muette, in Paris.

Philanthropy and charity work

Involved for years in humanitarian and charity work, Carla Bruni-Sarkozy became world ambassador for the protection of mothers and children against HIV in 2008. In April 2009, she launched the Fondation Carla Bruni-Sarkozy, to promote access to culture and knowledge for all.

In a letter of support to the association People for the Ethical Treatment of Animals, she took a position against fur in fashion.

Carla Bruni-Sarkozy is involved in various charitable activities. She gave her royalties for her album Comme si de rien n'était to the Fondation de France, and supports different events or causes, such as the Born HIV Free campaign, animal rights, the Nelson Mandela foundation, the French association AIDES for AIDS research, the French association La Chaîne de l'Espoir or the association Warchild UK. She also participated in a concert with Stevie Wonder and Aretha Franklin for the 91st birthday of Nelson Mandela, and recorded a song for the album We Were So Turned On: A Tribute to David Bowie. She is involved in the promotion of young artists, and did a duet with French singer Marc Lavoine for the Prix Constantin, an annual French music prize awarded to newer artists. Bruni met the Dalai Lama in August 2008 at Lerab Ling, a Buddhist temple on a hill in Languedoc, France. Bruni received Pope Benedict XVI during his visit to France in September 2008.

Bruni visited New York City in September 2008 with her husband, where she attended a meeting on poverty and female mortality with Queen Rania and Wendi Murdoch, met for lunch with First Lady Laura Bush at the Metropolitan Museum of Art for the Symposium on Advancing Global Literacy, and attended the General Assembly in the UN with her husband.

She attended state dinners with the Emir of Qatar and wife and with Iraq's president in Paris in 2009.  Sheikha Mozah (wife of Emir of Qatar) and she will be working together on the topic of education promotion. Bruni visited Doha on invitation of Sheikha Mozah in November 2009. Bruni took up the cause of an Iranian woman, Sakineh Mohammadi-Ashtiani, fighting a death penalty by stoning.

In April 2009, Bruni was awarded the Grand Cross of the Order of Charles III on the occasion of the couple's Spanish state visit. In January 2010, Bruni visited Benin, her second visit as ambassador for the Global Fund.

She was critical of Pope Benedict XVI on the controversial topic of religion and AIDS. According to Le Canard Enchainé, Bruni was asked by Vatican officials not to join her husband in an official visit for fear that the Italian newspapers would reprint racy pictures dating from her modelling career.

Discography

Studio albums
 2003: Quelqu'un m'a dit
 2007: No Promises
 2008: Comme si de rien n'était
 2013: Little French Songs
 2017: French Touch
 2020: Carla Bruni

Filmography

Honours
 France:
 Knight of the Ordre des Arts et des Lettres, 2003

Foreign honours
 Benin:
 Grand Cross of the National Order of Benin (2010)
 Spain:
 Grand Cross of the Order of Charles III (2009)

References

Further reading

External links 

 
Carla Bruni: from catwalk to Elysee – Expatica, 11 February 2008
{Carla Bruni On Bringing The 'French Touch' To Her Cover Album

|-

1967 births
Audiogram (label) artists
English-language singers from France
French female models
French women singers
French women singer-songwriters
Italian emigrants to France
Living people
Naturalized citizens of France
Nicolas Sarkozy
Models from Turin
Musicians from Turin
Spouses of French presidents
Carla
Chevaliers of the Ordre des Arts et des Lettres
French contraltos
Ministry of Sound artists
Naïve Records artists
Love Da Records artists